Kaunas Intermodal Terminal is a railway intermodal containers terminal in Kaunas, Lithuania. Terminal is located next to the Palemonas railway station.

History 
Location of the terminal was selected due Rail Baltica railway project in Kaunas. The total estimated cost of the project is 87.6 million Lt. Terminal officially opened on 26 May 2015.

Capacity 
Annual loading capacity is 55,000 TEU. It is second biggest intermodal terminal in the country after Vilnius Intermodal Terminal.

References

External links 
Official presentation
Lithuanian Intermodal Centers

Transport in Kaunas
2015 establishments in Lithuania
Container terminals
Dry ports